Gozar Gajin (also Romanized as Goz̄ar Gajīn; also known as Goz̄ar Kajīn and Gozar Kajīn) is a village in Darbandrud Rural District, in the Central District of Asadabad County, Hamadan Province, Iran. At the 2006 census, its population was 1,224, in 278 families.

References 

Populated places in Asadabad County